Lucky Break is a 2001 crime comedy film starring James Nesbitt and directed by Peter Cattaneo. The film is a co-production between the United Kingdom, United States and Germany.

Plot
James 'Jimmy' Hands and Rudy 'Rud' Guscott are two friends who used to play "Cops & Robbers" when they were young. Now adults, they plan to actually rob a bank, but the robbery goes wrong and Hands flees the bank leaving Guscott trapped behind the security shutters. Hands is caught and arrested not long later.

After being sentenced to do time in prison, Hands and Guscott make a daring escape plan as the prison is scheduled to put on a theatrical show of Nelson: The Musical. Hands and Guscott plan to use the show as cover their daring break-out attempt. During rehearsals, the inmates are unable to find a pianist for the show, until one inmate, Cliff Gumbell (Timothy Spall) volunteers and impresses them with his amazing piano skills. Hands is cast as Nelson (against his will) and Guscott is cast as Hardy, much to Guscott's dismay as his character kisses Nelson as he dies.

The escape plan proves difficult to proceed with, as one of the guards becomes very suspicious of Hands. Further complications arise when one of the more dangerous inmates threatens Hands to help him escape, as well as Hands warming to a prison employee named Annabel. During a prison visiting day, Gumbell is devastated to learn that his son is spending more time with his uncle, and that his wife is very disappointed being married to a criminal. Unable to live with the shame, Gumbell commits suicide in his cell.

The night of the show arrives and the escape plan is put into action. However, the dangerous inmate is tricked into going over the 30-foot prison wall and falls down the other side, where he is captured. Hands and Guscott are about to escape when Hands reveals his intentions to stay because of his feelings for Annabel. Guscott reluctantly lets Hands go and escapes with two other inmates, one of whom has a friend who arrives in a plane to help them escape.

Back in the prison, one of the guards resigns from his job over frustration of the inmates escaping and becomes a car park warden. Hands is later released from prison and starts a new life with Annabel.

Cast list
 James Nesbitt as James 'Jimmy' Hands / Lord Nelson in Show
 Olivia Williams as Annabel Sweep / Lady Hamilton in Show
 Timothy Spall as Cliff Gumbell
 Bill Nighy as Roger 'Rog' Chamberlain / King George III in Show
 Lennie James as Rudy 'Rud' Guscott / Hardy in Show
 Ron Cook as Mr. Perry, the Guard
 Frank Harper as John Toombes
 Raymond Waring as Darren
 Christopher Plummer as Graham Mortimer
 Julian Barratt as Paul Dean
 Peter Wight as Officer George Beorge Barratt
 Celia Imrie as Amy Chamberlin
 Peter McNamara as Ward
 Andy Linden as Kenny
 Ram John Holder as Old Billy Morris

Production

Anne Dudley collaborated with Stephen Fry to write and produce songs for the send-up musical "Nelson".

Exterior prison scenes were filmed at Dartmoor Prison, Princetown.

Reception
The film holds a 48% rating on Rotten Tomatoes based on 44 reviews with the critics consensus: "Lucky Break fails to do anything new with The Full Monty formula". On Metacritic, it holds a 48% rating based on 22 reviews, indicating "Mixed or average reviews".

Dave Kehr of The New York Times said that "Mr. Cattaneo restricts himself to the smiling blandness that has become the stock in trade of British comedies made for export, turning in a film that is forced, familiar and thoroughly condescending".

Michael O'Sullivan of The Washington Post wrote "Apart from the deja vu all over again, Lucky Break is no worse a film than Breaking Out, and [that film] was utterly charming".

According to Derek Elley of Variety, the film is "[c]hained to the floor by a script that isn't particularly funny, direction that goes for realism rather than stylization and an almost complete lack of comic timing".

References

External links
 

2001 films
British crime comedy films
American crime comedy films
German crime comedy films
2001 comedy films
British prison films
American prison films
Film4 Productions films
Miramax films
Paramount Pictures films
Films directed by Peter Cattaneo
Films scored by Anne Dudley
2000s English-language films
2000s British films
2000s German films
2000s American films
English-language German films